Michael Viggo Fausböll (22 September 1821 – 3 June 1908) was a Danish educator, translator, orientalist and  linguist.  He is most noted as a pioneer of Pāli scholarship.

Biography
Fausbøll was born at Hove near  Lemvig, Denmark. He became a student at the University of Copenhagen in 1838 and received his  Cand.theol. in  1847.
From 1878-1902 Fausbøll was professor   at the University of Copenhagen where he taught Sanskrit and East Indian philology,

His version of the Dhammapada was published in 1855 with a new edition in 1900. It formed   the basis for the first translation of this text into English, by  philologist, Max Müller (1823–1900) in the Sacred Books of the East, a 50-volume set published by Oxford University Press between 1879 and 1910.

He became a Knight of the Order of the Dannebrog in 1888, Dannebrogsmand  in 1891 and Commander  2nd degree in 1898. He died at Gentofte
in 1908 and was  buried at Gentofte Cemetery.

Publications
Fausböll's translations include:
 The Dhammapada: Being a collection of moral verses in Pali (trans. into Latin) (Copenhagen, 1855).
 Sutta-Nipata (Sacred Books of the East) (Oxford: Clarendon Press, 1881; and, London: PTS, 1885).
 Jataka with Commentary (London: PTS, 1877-1896).

Fausböll also wrote:
 Indian mythology according to the Mahabharata. (London: Luzac, 1903; reprinted as Indian mythology according to the Indian epics, New Delhi: Cosmo, 1981)

References

External links
Fausböll, V. (trans.) (1881)  The Dhammapada translated from the Pâli by V. Fausböll;  translated into English by F. Max Müller
 

1821 births
1908 deaths
People from Lemvig Municipality
University of Copenhagen alumni
Academic staff of the University of Copenhagen
Indologists
Buddhist studies scholars
Danish orientalists
Danish educators
18th-century Danish translators
Translators from Pali
Commanders Second Class of the Order of the Dannebrog